The 1973–74 Yugoslav Ice Hockey League season was the 32nd season of the Yugoslav Ice Hockey League, the top level of ice hockey in Yugoslavia. 14 teams participated in the league, and Olimpija have won the championship.

Final ranking
Olimpija
Jesenice
Medveščak
Slavija
Partizan
Red Star
Celje
Spartak Subotica
Kranjska Gora
Tivoli Ljubljana
Triglav Kranj
 Mladost Zagreb
INA Sisak
Gorenje Velenje

References

External links
Yugoslav Ice Hockey League seasons

Yugoslav
Yugoslav Ice Hockey League seasons
1973–74 in Yugoslav ice hockey